Alisa Harvey (temporarily Alisa Harvey-Hill; September 16, 1965) is a middle distance runner from the United States. She set her personal best in the women's 1,500 meters 4:08.32 on June 26, 1992, at the US Olympic Trials in New Orleans and in the 800 meters 1:59.72 in 1995. She was ranked in the U.S. top ten in the 1500 meters 8 years in a row from 1986 to 1993, achieving number 1 in 1993. After taking 1994 off for maternity, she returned to the list in 1998 and 1999. She also made the U.S. list in the 800 metres six times between 1988 and 1996. In 1998 she became the 24th American woman to break 4:30 for a mile. She is still an active masters competitor, holding several world records and pursuing more as she moves into a new age division.

Running career

High school
As a student athlete at Thomas Jefferson High School in Alexandria, Virginia, she set the still standing Virginia High School record for 1600 meters at 4:50. Her high school time for the 1500 metres still ranks as the #5 time, nationwide and has only been beaten once since she set it in 1983.

Collegiate
Next she ran for the University of Tennessee, on their NCAA Women's Indoor Track and Field Championship 4x800 meter relay team. She was part of another Tennessee 4x800 team that set the NCAA record. Individually she won the 1986 NCAA Women's Outdoor Track and Field Championship at 1500 meters.

Post-collegiate
She won the 1991 and 1999 editions of the Fifth Avenue Mile in New York City. Later on, she continued to run into the Masters division and currently holds the world indoor record for the mile in both the W35 and W40 division. She also holds the W40 American outdoor records in the 800 metres and 1 mile.

She helped as an assistant coach at George Mason University, George Mason High School and at Battlefield High School.

Achievements

References

External links
 Personal website 
 
 USATF bio 
Profile

1965 births
Living people
Sportspeople from Virginia
American female middle-distance runners
American masters athletes
Pan American Games gold medalists for the United States
Pan American Games medalists in athletics (track and field)
Athletes (track and field) at the 1991 Pan American Games
Pan American Games silver medalists for the United States
Medalists at the 1991 Pan American Games
21st-century American women